Baicë is a village in the District of Pristina, Kosovo. It is located southwest of Pristina, south of Komorane.

Notes and references

Notes

References

Villages in Drenas